Persatuan Sepakbola Mojokerto Putra is a professional Indonesian football team based in Mojokerto Regency, East Java. Their homeground is Gajah Mada Stadium, Mojokerto. They compete in the Liga 3.

Their most memorable achievement was when they won the Indonesian First Division in 2008.

Honours 
 Liga Indonesia First Division
 Champions: 2008

References

External links
 

 
Football clubs in Indonesia
Association football clubs established in 2001
Football clubs in East Java
2001 establishments in Indonesia